Bilge Ebiri (born 1973) is an English-born American journalist and filmmaker. His first feature film, a comedy thriller entitled New Guy, was released in 2004.

Early life and education
Ebiri studied film at Yale University where his thesis film, Bad Neighborhood won the Lamar Prize for Achievement in Film.

Career
After graduation, Ebiri worked as an assistant director for a Russian director Nikita Mikhalkov on The Barber of Siberia.

He both wrote and directed New Guy, his debut feature. Time Out called it "broadly predictable and increasingly one note, but passable sadistic fun." In 2003 he wrote, directed and co-produced the low-budget feature film New Guy. It was released in 2004 and after getting positive reviews in The New York Times and Variety, had a successful theatrical run in New York City. It was released on DVD in 2005 by Vanguard Cinema.

He became the lead critic at the Village Voice in February 2016.

Filmography
 Bad Neighborhood (1995)
 Infernal Racket (1996)
 New Guy (2003)
 Purse Snatcher (2006)
 Görünmeyen (2011)

References

External links
 
 

1973 births
Living people
American film critics
American film directors
American people of Turkish descent
British emigrants to the United States
English people of Turkish descent
People from York
Yale College alumni